Whig Lane is an unincorporated community located within Upper Pittsgrove Township in Salem County, New Jersey, United States.

The settlement is named for an altercation which occurred there in 1769 between Tories and Whigs.  Around that time—prior to the American Revolution—one part of the settlement was also called "Tory Lane".

Whig Lane had a post office in 1897.

References

Upper Pittsgrove Township, New Jersey
Unincorporated communities in Salem County, New Jersey
Unincorporated communities in New Jersey